In association football, an assist is a contribution by a player which helps to score a goal. Statistics for assists made by players may be kept officially by the organisers of a competition, or unofficially by, for example, journalists or organisers of fantasy football competitions. Recording assists is not part of the official Laws of the Game and the criteria for an assist to be awarded may vary. Record of assists was virtually not kept at all until the end of the 20th century, although reports of matches commonly described a player as having "made" one or more goals. Since the 1990s, some leagues have kept official record of assists and based awards on them.

Criteria 
Most commonly, an assist is credited to a player for passing or crossing the ball to the scorer.  It may also be awarded to a player whose shot rebounds (off a defender, goalkeeper or goalpost) to a teammate who scores. Some systems may credit an assist to a player who wins a penalty kick or a free kick for another player to convert, or to an attacking player for contributing to an own goal. A goal may be unassisted, or have one assist; some systems allow for two assists.

FIFA World Cup
FIFA's Technical Study Group is responsible for awarding assist points at the FIFA World Cup. In the Technical Study Group's report on the 1986 World Cup, the authors calculated for the first time unofficial statistics for assists, developing the following criteria:
 An assist was awarded to the player who had given the last pass to the goalscorer.
 In addition, the last but two holder of the ball could get an assist provided that his action had decisive importance for the goal.
 After goals from rebounds those players were awarded an assist who had shot on target.
 After goals scored on penalty or by a directly converted free-kick the fouled player received a point.
 In case that the goalscorer had laid on the goal for himself (dribble, solo run), no assists were awarded.
 No assists were awarded, either, if the goalscorer took advantage of a missed pass by an opponent.

The 1990 World Cup technical report adopted similar criteria, but changed the free-kick/penalty criterion:
Where goals resulting from penalties are concerned, the player who is fouled in the area receives an assist point (unless, that is, the player who is fouled subsequently executes the penalty himself).

Planet World Cup has calculated some retrospective data on assists back to the 1966 World Cup, though the 1986 data differs from that of FIFA.

FIFA started officially keeping track of assists in World Cup tournaments at the 1994 edition. This was popularly ascribed to the popularity of detailed sports statistics among fans. 1994 was also the first World Cup in which assists were used as a tie-breaker in determining the Golden Shoe award for top scorer. In the event, both Hristo Stoichkov and Oleg Salenko tied with 19 points, from 6 goals and 1 assist.

France
The French league, Ligue 1, awards the Trophée de Meilleur Passeur ("best passer trophy") to the player with most "decisive passes" in a season, starting in the 2007–08 season. Sports newspaper L'Équipe had unofficially tracked assists for some years prior to then. The league's Commission des Compétitions includes blocked shots as a subset of "decisive passes". In 2012–13, Mathieu Valbuena and Dimitri Payet finished with 12 assists, Valbuena winning the trophy by having fewer blocked shots (3 against 5) among his total.

Spain

United Kingdom
In the United Kingdom, official game statistics, including assists, for the Premier League, the Scottish Premiership, and the English Football League are provided by PA Sport under the Actim brand. Since the 2006–07 season, assists have been factored into the Actim Index of Premier League player performance. The assist statistics provided by fantasy football competitions may differ from the Actim data; some uniformly credit an assist to whichever teammate last touched the ball before the scorer, regardless of other circumstances of the play. The Premier League Playmaker of the Season award was introduced in the 2017–18 Premier League for the player with most assists.

United States
The original North American Soccer League kept assist statistics from its foundation in 1968, as its forebears the United Soccer Association and National Professional Soccer League had done the previous year. Analogous statistics were already being kept in basketball and in ice hockey, both established North American sports.

Major League Soccer formerly awarded the MLS Golden Boot based on 2 points per goal scored and one per assist.

The NCAA makes regulations for statistics, including assists, in college soccer in the U.S. Two players may be credited with assists if the second did not have to beat a defender before passing to the scorer. No assist is awarded for winning a penalty. If a goal is scored after a save, block, or rebound from the goal frame, the first shooter gets an assist.

Statistics
These totals are the official records recognised by the relevant governing body. Independent statistics providers may have different data, either through crediting different players for a given goal, or through having begun recording assists earlier or later than the official statistics provider.

References

Assist (association football)
Association football terminology